Franjo Wölfl (18 May 1918 – 8 July 1987) was a Croatian footballer.

Club career
Wölfl spent much of his career with Građanski Zagreb. With Građanski he was the top scorer in the Croatian First League's 1943 season. After World War II, Građanski was disbanded by the communist authorities and Wölfl moved to the regime's newly formed club Dinamo Zagreb. With Dinamo, Wölfl was the Yugoslav First League's top scorer in 1947 and 1948.

International career
He played international football first with the Kingdom of Yugoslavia national team from 1938 and then the Croatian national team from 1940 to 1944. He played 4 of those for the Jozo Jakopić-led Banovina and the other 14 games under the flag of the Independent State of Croatia, a World War II-era puppet state of Nazi Germany. Finally, Wölfl suited up for communist Yugoslavia's national team from 1945 to 1951.

References

External links
 
Franjo Wölfl at Reprezentacija.rs 
BIO JE PRVI PRAVI 'PLAVI 9' Zabijao je poput Messija danas, o njegovom voleju još kruže legende, a imao je samo jednu manu... 

1918 births
1987 deaths
Footballers from Zagreb
Croatian people of German descent
Association football forwards
Yugoslav footballers
Yugoslavia international footballers
Footballers at the 1948 Summer Olympics
Olympic footballers of Yugoslavia
Olympic silver medalists for Yugoslavia
Medalists at the 1948 Summer Olympics
Olympic medalists in football
Croatian footballers
Croatia international footballers
Dual internationalists (football)
FC Viktoria Plzeň players
HŠK Građanski Zagreb players
GNK Dinamo Zagreb players
Expatriate footballers in Czechoslovakia
Yugoslav First League players
Yugoslav football managers
Yugoslavia national football team managers
Burials at Mirogoj Cemetery